The 2010 AMJ Campbell Shorty Jenkins Classic was held September 16–19, 2010 at the Brockville Country Club in Brockville, Ontario. It was on the second week of the men's World Curling Tour and the first week of the Women's tour. It was one of two WCT events held that weekend (the other was The Shoot-Out).

The total purse for the men's event was $40,700, while the total purse for the women's event was $16,400.

The event tested a new positioning of the hack, the starting block for curlers. For the tournament, the hacks were located right next each other, instead of the small gap that exists normally.

Men's

Teams
 Mark Bice
 Pierre Charette
 Dave Collyer
 Denis Cordick
 Robert Desjardins
 John Epping
 Pete Fenson
 Martin Ferland
 Keil Gallinger
 Chris Gardner
 Jason Gunnlaugson
 Brad Gushue
 Guy Hemmings
 Glenn Howard
 Brad Jacobs
 Dale Matchett
 Jeff McCrady
 Jean-Michel Ménard
 Matt Paul
 Ian Robertson
 Jeff Stoughton
 Ken Thompson
 Wayne Tuck, Jr.
 Tyler George

Draw

Playoffs

Women's

Teams
 Ève Bélisle
 Chrissy Cadorin
 Lisa Farnell
 Jacqueline Harrison
 Rachel Homan
 Tracy Horgan
 Barb Kelly
 Marie-France Larouche
 Carrie Lindner
 Kimberly Mastine
 Robyn Mattie
 Chantal Osborne

Draw

Playoffs

References

External links
Official Website
WCT event page (men's)
WCT event page (women's)

2010
AMJ Campbell Shorty Jenkins Classic
AMJ Campbell
AMJ Campbell